Lori Gottlieb is an American writer and psychotherapist.  She is the author of the New York Times bestseller, Maybe You Should Talk to Someone, which is being adapted as a TV series. She also writes the weekly “Dear Therapist” advice column for The Atlantic and is the co-host of the iHeart Radio podcast "Dear Therapists." Her TED Talk was one of the top most-watched talks of 2019.

Life and career
Gottlieb was born in Los Angeles in 1966. She obtained her undergraduate degree from Stanford University in 1989, where she was a member of Kappa Kappa Gamma.  She obtained a Masters of Clinical Psychology at Pepperdine University in 2010. She is a licensed Marriage and Family Therapist.

Gottlieb was a commentator for National Public Radio and a contributing editor for The Atlantic. She has written for various publications and appeared on various TV shows.

She told the story of how she had her son at The Moth mainstage show in Aspen.

Her memoir/self-help book Maybe You Should Talk to Someone is being developed and adapted for television by Eva Longoria for ABC Network.

Works
 Maybe You Should Talk to Someone: A Therapist, Her Therapist, and Our Lives Revealed, Houghton Mifflin, 2019  
Marry Him: The Case for Settling for Mr Good Enough
Stick Figure: A Diary of My Former Self

References

Living people
American Jews
American non-fiction writers
Stanford University alumni
Year of birth missing (living people)